Beshrabot is a village and seat of Navbakhor District in Navoiy Region in Uzbekistan.

References

Populated places in Navoiy Region